In Your Mind is the fourth solo studio album by English singer and songwriter Bryan Ferry. It was his first solo album of all original songs.

As Ferry's first solo all-original LP effort, released after Ferry's band Roxy Music went on a four-year hiatus, it was supported by an extensive tour.

Critical reception

The Village Voices Robert Christgau wrote in his review of In Your Mind: "Ferry has custom-designed a new line of songs for his solo concept, rather than borrowing from early Roxy or his humble forebears, and especially on side one the stuff is appealingly down-to-earth." In 1992's The Rolling Stone Album Guide, Mark Coleman said that "In Your Mind strives for the windswept, bracing impact of Roxy Music's classic Siren. The surfeit of Ferry's compositions is gratifying, though even the hookiest ('Tokyo Joe,' 'Party Doll') merely restate Roxy's familiar romantic and musical themes."

AllMusic critic Ned Raggett later wrote that In Your Mind "remains the secret highlight of Ferry's musical career, an energetic album that would have received far more attention as a full Roxy release."

Track listing

Personnel 
Note: The LP's sleeve notes includes "thanks" to a list of musicians. Only their names are mentioned, whilst their instruments and the exact songs on which they play are not. The following list merely tentatively mentions the instruments the same musicians have played on other Ferry records.

 Bryan Ferry – vocals, keyboards
 David Skinner – acoustic piano
 Neil Hubbard – guitars
 Phil Manzanera – guitars
 Chris Spedding – guitars
 John Porter – bass
 John Wetton – bass
 Paul Thompson – drums
 Ray Cooper – percussion
 Morris Pert – percussion
 Mel Collins – saxophones, horn arrangements
 Chris Mercer – saxophones, horn arrangements
 Martin Drover – trumpet
 Ann Odell – string arrangements
 Dyan Birch – backing vocals 
 Doreen Chanter – backing vocals 
 Helen Chappelle – backing vocals 
 Frankie Collins – backing vocals
 Preston Hayward – backing vocals 
 Paddie McHugh – backing vocals 
 Jacqui Sullivan – backing vocals

Production 
 Bryan Ferry – producer 
 Steve Nye – producer, engineer
 Ross Cullum – assistant engineer
 Nigel Walker – assistant engineer
 Nick de Ville – design
 Bob Bowkett (C.C.S.) – artwork
 Monty Coles – photography

Charts

Weekly charts

Year-end charts

Certifications

References

 David Buckley (2004). The Thrill of It All: The Story of Bryan Ferry and Roxy Music

External links
 Roxyrama 
 Viva Roxy Music
 British certification

1977 albums
Bryan Ferry albums
Albums produced by Steve Nye
E.G. Records albums
Albums recorded at AIR Studios